Rapla County ( or Raplamaa) is one of the fifteen counties of Estonia. It is situated in the western part of the country and borders Järva County to the east, Pärnu County to the south, Lääne County to the west, and Harju County to the north. In 2022 Rapla County had a population of 33,529 – constituting 2.5% of the total population of Estonia.

History 
The first written records of Rapla date back to the 1241 Danish census (Liber Census Daniae).

County government 
The County Government (Estonian: Maavalitsus) is led by a governor (Estonian: maavanem), who is appointed by the Government of Estonia for a term of five years. Since 2009, the Governor position is held by Tiit Leier.

Municipalities 

The county is subdivided into municipalities. There are 4 rural municipalities (Estonian: vallad – parishes) in Rapla County:

Religion

Geography 
Natural resources found in Rapla county include limestone, dolomite, peat, and clay.

Miscellaneous topics 
The church of Rapla was built in 1901. However, much of the interior dates back to several hundred years earlier and is of high structural quality and historical value. In the churchyard there are several crosses remaining from the 17th century.

Gallery

References

External links

Lääne-Viru County Government – Official website
Lääne-Virumaa County Infoserver – map and tourism info

 
Counties of Estonia